Julianne Rwakakoko Mweheire (née Julianne Rwakakoko), but commonly referred to as Julianne Mweheire, is a Ugandan management professional, accountant and corporate executive. She serves as the Director of Content Development and Industry Affairs at the Uganda Communications Commission, effective August 2018. Before that, she worked as a Senior Manager, Carrier Relations and a Senior Accountant, Interconnection and Roaming, at MTN Uganda.

Background and education
She was born in Ntungamo District, in the Western Region of Uganda, to Elly Rwakakoko, a former Director-General of the Uganda Revenue Authority.

She started her early Education at Kitante Primary School in Kampala. She holds a Bachelor of Arts degree in Business Management, Economics and Accounting. Later, she graduated from the Stevens Institute of Technology, in New Jersey, United States, with a Master of Science degree in  Telecommunications Management.

Work experience
For a period of nearly twenty years, starting in 2000, Julianne worked in various positions, including as a Senior Manager and as a Senior Accountant, at MTN Uganda, the largest mobile network operator in that East African country.

Upon her appointment to her current position, she replaced Tumubweine Twinemanzi, who was appointed Executive Director of Bank Supervision at Bank of Uganda, Uganda's central bank.

See also
 List of wealthiest people in Uganda

References

External links
UCC flags off Uganda’s nominees in Africa Magic Viewers Choice Awards to Nigeria As of 30 August 2018.

Living people
1975 births
People from Ntungamo District
Ugandan women business executives
Ugandan business executives
21st-century Ugandan businesswomen
21st-century Ugandan businesspeople
People from Western Region, Uganda
Stevens Institute of Technology alumni